This is a list of Belgian television related events from 1997.

Events
Unknown - Sarah De Koster wins the eighth season of VTM Soundmixshow, performing as Alanis Morissette.

Debuts

Unknown - VTM Soundmixshow (1989-1995, 1997-2000)

Television shows

1990s
Samson en Gert (1990–present)
Familie (1991–present)
Wittekerke (1993-2008)
Thuis (1995–present)

Ending this year

Births

Deaths